Lieutenant-Colonel Lewis Phillips Winby (1874–1956) was Conservative MP for Harborough from 1924 to 1929.

Educated at Brighton College and Trinity College, Cambridge, where he studied engineering, Winby served in the Royal Engineers during the Second Boer War and the First World War.

Sources 

Whitaker's Almanack, 1925 to 1929 editions
Craig, F.W.S. British Parliamentary Election Results

Conservative Party (UK) MPs for English constituencies
Politics of Leicestershire
1874 births
1956 deaths
Royal Engineers officers
Westminster Dragoons officers
British Army personnel of the Second Boer War
British Army personnel of World War I
Recipients of the Croix de Guerre 1914–1918 (France)
People educated at Brighton College
Alumni of Trinity College, Cambridge